Maha Vihara Maitreya  is a Buddhist temple located on Medan, which is claimed to be the largest non-historical buddhist temple in Indonesia. This temple is often called Vihara Cemara Asri because it is located in housing complex of Cemara Asri. Maha Vihara Maitreya was built in 1991 on an area of 4.5 hectares and was inaugurated on August 21, 2008.

Overview 
This temple was built as a place of worship for Buddhists adherent in Medan in particular, and North Sumatra in general, given the large number of ethnic Chinese living in the city and in accordance with its name, Maitreya, this temple is very thick with the teachings of Maitreya Buddha that teaches love on universe.

Even though one of the largest temples in Indonesia, but the interior is graced Maha Vihara Maitreya looks simple and provides a calm and silent, thus adding solemnity of worship.

The Temple building is divided into three main rooms. The first building there is a common Baktisala that a place of worship Buddha Sakyamuni, Bodhisattva and the Bodhisattva Satyakalama Avolokitesvara. The building has a capacity of 1,500 people.

In the second building of the Maitreya Baktisala area with a capacity of 2,500 people. In this section there are also has Baktisala Holy Patriarch. In addition, there is a banquet hall as a special dining room reception.

Meanwhile, the third building is a meeting hall with a capacity of 2,000 people. All the buildings has guest house, only guesthouse in one building has the most complete facilities, namely the existence of office space, meeting rooms, recording studios and a communal kitchen.

This temple also decorated with various statues of dragons and mythical animals reliefs on the walls of the monastery like a phoenix and dragon. On the right temple also contained a floating teapot fountain.

See also 
Gunung Timur Temple
Buddhism in Indonesia

References 

Medan
Buddhist temples in Indonesia
Buildings and structures in Medan
Maitreya
Religious buildings and structures completed in 2008
21st-century Buddhist temples